Superfan or Super Fan may refer to:

 An extremely enthusiastic fan (person) of a sports team or entertainer
 Giles Pellerin (1906–1998), nicknamed Superfan, notable fan of the USC Trojans
"Bill Swerski's Superfans", a recurring sketch on Saturday Night Live
 Superfan, a 1970s comic strip by Nick Meglin and Jack Davis
 IAE SuperFan, an aircraft engine design study
 Super Fan (game show), a 2020 Indian TV game show

See also

James Goldstein (born 1940), American businessman who attends a large number of NBA games